Rikki Belder (born 2 July 1993) is a former Australian track sprint cyclist. She was the 2017 Oceania Champion in the 500m Team Sprint (with Holly Takos and Courtney Field), and has won six Australian Titles in the same event with fellow South Australian team members Anna Meares OAM and Stephanie Morton OAM.

Belder holds the Australian Championship Record in the 500m Team Sprint (with Stephanie Morton). She represented Australia at the 2015 Union Cycliste Internationale – UCI Track Cycling World Cup III in Cali, Colombia, and at the 2017 Oceania Track Cycling Championships.

Biography 

Rikki Belder was born in Adelaide, South Australia on 2 July 1993. She was a scholarship holder at the South Australian Sports Institute (SASI) from 2011 - 2017. Belder studied Biomedical Engineering at Flinders University.

She is the daughter of Lyn and Gary Belder. Sister Donna Belder, held a PhD research scholarship in ornithology at the Fenner School of Environment and Society, Australian National University (ANU).

In 2014, Rikki Belder was listed as one of South Australia's Fastest-Rising Stars Under 30. Belder has completed some art work for charity.

Palmares - Cycling 

2018
 1st  500m Team Sprint (With Morton and Takos) Australian National Championships QLD
 3rd Keirin Australian National Championships QLD

2017

 1st  500m Team Sprint (With Takos and Field) Oceania Championships VIC
 1st  500m Team Sprint (With Morton and Takos) Australian National Championships QLD
 2nd 500m Time Trial Australian National Championships QLD
 4th Keirin Australian National Championships QLD
 6th Sprint Oceania Championships VIC
 6th Sprint Australian National Championships QLD
 10th Keirin Oceania Championships VIC

2016
 2nd 500m Team Sprint (With Hargrave) Australian National Championships SA
 3rd Keirin Australian National Championships SA
3rd Keirin, ITS Melbourne Grand Prix
2015
 1st  500m Team Sprint (With Meares and Morton) Australian National Championships VIC
 1st  500m Time Trial Australian National Championships VIC
 3rd Keirin Oceania Championships SA
3rd Keirin, Austral Wheelrace Carnival

2014
 1st  500m Team Sprint (With Morton) Australian National Championships SA
Austral Wheelrace Carnival 
1st Keirin 
 2nd Sprint 
 3rd Keirin Oceania Track Championships
 3rd 500m Time Trial Oceania Track Championships

2013
 1st  500m Team Sprint (With Morton) Australian National Championships NSW
 2nd 500m Team Sprint (With Morton) Oceania Championships NSW
 3rd 500m Time Trial Australian National Championships NSW
2012
 1st  500m Team Sprint (With Meares) Australian National Championships SA
 2nd 500m Time Trial Australian National Championships SA
 2nd 500m Time Trial Oceania Championships NZL
 2nd Team Sprint (With Falappi) Oceania Championships NZL

Sponsorship 

Belder was a GKA Sports Distribution (http://www.gkasports.com.au) supported athlete.

References 

1993 births
Australian female cyclists
Living people